Pilsbryspira kandai is a species of sea snail, a marine gastropod mollusk in the family Pseudomelatomidae, the turrids and allies.

Description

Distribution
This marine species occurs off Japan.

References

 Kuroda, T. "The Recent molluscan fauna of Japan." Journal de Conchyliologie 90 (1950): 200-207.

External links
 

kandai
Gastropods described in 1950